Goverdhan Upadhyay (22 September 1943 – 5 November 2020) was an Indian politician and a member of the Indian National Congress party.

Career
Govardhan Upadhyay was elected MLA for Sironj Madhya Pradesh Constituency with Indian National Congress ticket in 1984 and 2013. 
He was also involved in village state politics where he was sarpanch, Zila Parishad president.
He was very active in social work from childhood.
He was one of the founder trustees of Shree Sadguru Seva Sang Trust Aanandpur Madhya Pradesh and Chitrkut.

He was MLA for Sironj Legislative Constituency twice.

Political views
He  strongly supported Congress Party's ideology.

Personal life
Married to late Savitri Upadhyay, he had four sons and three daughters.

Education - BA LLB

Profession - farmer, politician

References

See also

Madhya Pradesh Legislative Assembly
2013 Madhya Pradesh Legislative Assembly election
2008 Madhya Pradesh Legislative Assembly election

Indian National Congress politicians from Madhya Pradesh
1943 births
2020 deaths
Barkatullah University alumni